Craig McKinley may refer to:

 Craig R. McKinley (born 1952), United States Air Force and National Guard general
 Craig McKinley (physician) (1964–2013), Canadian physician and aquanaut

See also
 Craig Mackinlay (born 1966), British Conservative Party politician